Chen Shizeng (born March 2, 1876, Fenghuang, Hunan, died September 12, 1923, Nanjing, Jiangsu), original name Chen Hengke, courtesy name Shizeng, art name Xiudaoren Xiuzhe, was a Chinese painter and critic, painter, and educator of early 20th-century China. At a time when some Chinese artists were rejecting traditional painting styles in favor of Western influenced styles, Chen championed traditional literati art in his own art and in his A Study of Chinese Literati Painting.

Shizeng was the son of Chen Baozhen, a Qing dynasty governor of Hunan.

Sources

References

External links
Chen Shizeng and his Painting Gallery at China Online Museum

Hakka people

Qing dynasty painters
1876 births
1923 deaths
Republic of China painters
People from Xiangxi
Painters from Hunan
Burials in Hangzhou